Terje Luik (born on 13 April 1941) is an Estonian film actress and television director.

After 1961 she hasn't played on films anymore. In 1960s she worked as an assistant director at Estonian Television.

Filmography 
 1959 "Vallatud kurvid" (role: Vaike and Maret)
 1960 "Perekond Männard" (role: Helmi Neider)
 1961 "Ohtlikud kurvid" (role: Marika and Ellen)
 1961 "Maizes ducis" (role: passenger)

References

Living people
1941 births
Estonian film actresses
Estonian directors
20th-century Estonian actresses